Count Adam Gurowski (September 10, 1805, in Russocice near Kalisz, Poland – May 4, 1866, in Washington, D.C.) was a Polish-born author who emigrated to the United States in 1849.

Biography
He was a son of the Count Władysław Gurowski, an ardent admirer of Tadeusz Kościuszko. Having been expelled in 1818 and again in 1819 from the gymnasia of Warsaw and Kalisz for revolutionary demonstrations, young Gurowski continued his studies at various German universities. He studied under Hegel at Berlin University and obtained a degree from Heidelberg University.

Returning to Warsaw in 1825, he became identified with those opposed to Russian influence, and was in consequence several times imprisoned. He was active in organizing the November uprising of 1830, in which he afterward took part. On its suppression, Adam lost the greater part of his estates and escaped to France, where he lived for several years. While there he became associated with the Saint-Simonians, and adopted many of the views of Charles Fourier. He was also a member of the national Polish committee in Paris, and became conspicuous in political and literary circles. The remainder of his estates had in the meantime been confiscated and he himself condemned to death.

He married Theresa de Zbijewska in 1827. They had two children. Theresa died in 1832.

In 1835, he published a work entitled La vérité sur la Russie, in which he advocated a union of the different branches of the Slavic race. The book being favorably regarded by the Russian government, Gurowski was recalled, and, although his estates were not restored, he was employed in the civil service. In 1843, the Marquis de Custine, lover of Gurowski's brother Ignacy, published La Russie en 1839, a polemical travelogue focusing on the Russian Empire. In 1844, finding that he had many powerful enemies at court, Gurowski left secretly for Berlin and went thence to Heidelberg. Here he gave himself to study, and for two years lectured on political economy in the University of Bern, Switzerland. He then went to Italy.

In 1849, he went to the United States, where he engaged in literary pursuits and became deeply interested in American politics. He wrote articles for the American Cyclopaedia and worked on the editorial staff of the New York Tribune. During the Crimean War, he sided with Russia, and his editorials and pamphlets were an effective influence on American public opinion in favor of Russia. He was strongly opposed to slavery. After president Lincoln's election and in the lead up to his inauguration, Gurowski met with pro-Union Republicans in Washington who were delegates to the "Peace Conference," warning them of secessionist plots to disrupt the electoral college and further, of Southern intentions to foment takeover of the government either at the time electoral ballots were counted or on March 4—inauguration day.

From 1861 to 1863, he was translator in the State Department in Washington D.C., being acquainted with eight languages. In 1862, he published the first volume of his three-volume Diary. It included three categories of men: Praise, Half and Half and Blame. President Abraham Lincoln merited the Praise column, as did Edwin M. Stanton and poet Walt Whitman, but otherwise Gurowski was highly critical of officials in the Lincoln administration. William O’Connor, who translated some of the count's papers into English, described him as "a madman with lucid intervals." Whitman wrote, "He knew every thing & growled & found fault with everybody—but was always very courteous to me."

Count Gurowski died in May 1866 and was buried in Congressional Cemetery. Whitman considered the tempestuous count a friend and attended his funeral. "His funeral was simple but very impressive—all the big radicals were there," Whitman wrote.

Works
La civilisation et la Russie (St. Petersburg, 1840)
Russland und die Civilisation (Übersetzer : Alvensleben) (Leipzig, 1841)
Pensées sur l'avenir des Polonais (Berlin, 1841)
Aus meinem Gedankenbuche (Breslau, 1843)
Eine Tour durch Belgien (Heidelberg, 1845)
Impressions et souvenirs (Lausanne, 1846)
Die letzten Ereignisse in den drei Theilen des alten Polen (The latest events in the three parts of old Poland; Munich, 1846)
Le Panslavisme (Florence, 1848)
Russia as it Is (New York, 1854)
The Turkish Question (1854)
A Year of the War (1855)
America and Europe (1857)
Slavery in History (1860)
My Diary, notes on the Civil War (3 vols., 1862–66)

References

External links

 Biography with portrait.

1805 births
1866 deaths
American male writers
Counts of Poland
Pan-Slavism
People from Turek County
Polish emigrants to the United States
Polish male writers